Below is a list of degree-granting music institutions of higher learning in the United States.  As of 2017, in the United States, there were 650 degree-granting institutions of higher learning that were accredited by the National Association of Schools of Music.  There are also several notable institutions of higher learning that are – for various reasons, by choice or otherwise – not accredited by NASM.

Private institutions

Independent conservatories of music 
 Berklee College of Music, Boston
 Cleveland Institute of Music
 The Curtis Institute of Music, Philadelphia
 Interlochen Arts Academy, Interlochen, Michigan
 Manhattan School of Music, New York
 New England Conservatory, Boston
 San Francisco Conservatory of Music
 VanderCook College of Music, Chicago

Independent for-profit conservatories of music 
 La Jolla Conservatory of Music
 McNally Smith College of Music, Saint Paul, Minnesota (Shut down as of 2018)
 Musicians Institute, Los Angeles

Liberal arts colleges, secular 
 Bard College Conservatory of Music, Annandale-on-Hudson, New York
 Ithaca College School of Music, Ithaca, New York
 Lawrence University Conservatory of Music, Appleton, Wisconsin
 Longy School of Music (recently merged with Bard College)
 Oberlin Conservatory of Music (Oberlin College), Oberlin, Ohio

Liberal arts colleges, non-secular 
 Baldwin Wallace Conservatory of Music (United Methodist), Berea, Ohio
 Birmingham–Southern Conservatory of Fine and Performing Arts (United Methodist)
 Concordia College Conservatory (Lutheran Church–Missouri Synod), Bronxville, New York
 Saint Mary-of-the-Woods Conservatory of Music (Catholic, Sisters of Providence of Saint Mary-of-the-Woods), Saint Mary-of-the-Woods, Indiana
 Gettysburg College, Sunderman Conservatory of Music, Gettysburg, Pennsylvania
 Wheaton College, Conservatory of Music, Wheaton, Illinois

Schools of the Arts 
 Boston Conservatory at Berklee, Boston
 Cornish College of the Arts, Seattle
 Juilliard School, New York City
 The Colburn School, Los Angeles
 The University of the Arts, Philadelphia

Private universities, secular 
 Boston University College of Fine Arts
 Carnegie Mellon School of Music, Pittsburgh
 Eastman School of Music (University of Rochester)
 Frost School of Music (University of Miami), Coral Gables, Florida
 The Hartt School (University of Hartford)
 Lamont School of Music (University of Denver), Denver, Colorado
 Lynn University Conservatory of Music, Boca Raton, Florida
 Mannes School of Music (The New School), New York City
 The Music Conservatory of Chicago College of Performing Arts (Roosevelt University), Chicago
 The New School for Jazz and Contemporary Music (The New School), New York City
 Northwestern University, Bienen School of Music, Evanston, Illinois
 Peabody Institute (Johns Hopkins University), Baltimore
 Point Park Conservatory of Performing Arts, Pittsburgh
 Shepherd School of Music (Rice University), Houston
 University of the Pacific, Conservatory of Music, Stockton, California
 USC Thornton School of Music, University Park, Los Angeles
 Vanderbilt University, Blair School of Music (undergraduate only), Nashville
 Westminster Choir College (Rider University), Princeton
 Wilkes University Conservatory of Music, Wilkes-Barre, Pennsylvania
 Syracuse University, Setnor School of Music
 Yale School of Music, New Haven, Connecticut

Private universities, non-secular 
 Biola University Conservatory of Music (non-denominational, Evangelical Christian), La Mirada, California
 Brigham Young University, School of Music (Church of Jesus Christ of Latter-day Saints), Provo, Utah
 Capital University Conservatory of Music (Evangelical Lutheran Church in America), Bexley, Ohio
 Chapman University Conservatory of Music (Christian Church, Disciples of Christ), Orange, California
 Duquesne University, Mary Pappert School of Music (Catholic Church), Pittsburgh, Pennsylvania
 Shenandoah University Conservatory (United Methodist Church), Winchester, Virginia
 University of Mary Hardin–Baylor Conservatory of Music, Belton, Texas

Public institutions

Pre-college public schools of the art 
 Oakland Public Conservatory of Music

Public universities 
 City University of New York constituents
 Brooklyn College Conservatory of Music
 State University of New York constituents
 State University of New York at Purchase Conservatory of Music, Purchase
 State University of New York at Fredonia, Fredonia School of Music, Fredonia
 State University of New York at Potsdam, Crane School of Music, Potsdam
 Bob Cole Conservatory of Music (California State University, Long Beach)
 Cadek Conservatory (University of Tennessee), Knoxville
 FSU College of Music, Tallahassee
 Indiana University Bloomington, Jacobs School of Music
 Kean University Conservatory of Music
 Lionel Hampton School of Music (University of Idaho), Moscow
 LSU School of Music, Baton Rouge
 State University of New York at Potsdam, Crane School of Music
 UCLA Herb Alpert School of Music
 University of Cincinnati – College-Conservatory of Music
University of Colorado-Boulder College of Music
University of Maryland School of Music
 University of Michigan School of Music, Theatre & Dance, Ann Arbor
 University of Missouri–Kansas City Conservatory
 University of North Texas College of Music, Denton
 University of Oregon School of Music and Dance, Eugene
 University of Texas at Austin, Butler School of Music
 University of North Carolina School of the Arts

Former music institutions of higher learning 
 American Conservatory of Music (1886–1991), Chicago
 American Institute of Applied Music (1900–1933), New York
 Combs College of Music (1885–1990), Philadelphia
 Detroit Institute of Musical Arts (1914–1970)
 Ellison-White Conservatory of Music (1918–1940s), Portland, Oregon
 Hartford Conservatory (1890–2011)

Former music institutions at historically black colleges and universities 
 Western University, School of Music (1865–1943), Quindaro, Kansas City, Kansas

See also 
 :Category:Music schools in the United States by state

American music-related lists